Tall-e Gachi (also Romanized as Tall-e Gachī; also known as Tall-e Khoshkī) is a village in Kuhak Rural District, in the Central District of Jahrom County, Fars Province, Iran. At the 2006 census, its population was 24, in 4 families.

References 

Populated places in Jahrom County